Terrence Des Pres (1939 in Effingham, Illinois – November 16, 1987 in Hamilton, New York) was an American writer and Holocaust scholar.

Life 
Terrence Des Pres graduated from Southeast Missouri State College in 1962.
He went on to complete graduate degrees in philosophy at Washington University in St. Louis.
He spent time with John Nathan at Harvard University as Harvard Junior Fellows, where Des Pres was the society's sommelier and they formed a friendship.

He was married twice and had a son with his first wife.

Work 
Des Pres is most well known for his work on the Holocaust documented in: The Survivor: An Anatomy of Life in the Death Camps.

At Colgate University he taught "Literature of the Holocaust" and was the William Henry Crawshaw Chair in Literature. At Colgate, he spent time with writer Frederick Busch.

He wrote Praises and Dispraises, published posthumously in 1988, which dealt with poetry and its usefulness for survival.

Death 
According to John Nathan's memoir, Des Pres committed suicide on November 16, 1987. Des Pres' death was ruled "accidental" by the Madison county medical examiners office, Madison, NY.  According to a 1990 Boston Globe article, Des Pres died by hanging.

After his death, poet Paul Mariani spoke at a service for Des Pres at Colgate, where they may have spent time together as Mariani worked on his master's degree.

See also
List of Harvard Junior Fellows
Carolyn Forché, who was influenced by Des Pres, and organized the "Genocide and Memory" conference in 1997, where Des Pres was remembered. Her poem "Ourselves or Nothing" is about Des Pres.
Peter Balakian, poet and Colgate professor, also organized the 1997 "Genocide and Memory conference.  In addition to their Colgate connection, Balakian is of Armenian descent, and Des Pres' work with survival literature included the Armenian genocide.
Paul Mariani, poet, wrote the introduction to Des Pres' collection of essays "Writing Into the World"
Geoffrey Hartman, professor at Yale University, had interviewed Des Pres and presented a video of it at the "Genocide and Memory" conference along with a paper.

Bibliography 
; reprint, Oxford University Press, 1980, 

Writing into the World.  New York: Viking. 1991.  forward by Elie Wiesel 
 "Remembering Armenia" to introduce The Armenian Genocide in Perspective.  edited by Richard G. Hovannisian  Transaction Publishers: 1986.    
"Introduction" for Treblinka: The inspiring story of the 600 Jews who revolted against their murderers and burned a Nazi death camp to the ground, by Jean-Francois Steiner.  Plume, 1994.

Edited

Awards 

 1978: National Jewish Book Award in the Holocaust category for The Survivor: An Anatomy of Life in the Death Camps

References

Sources 
"Living Carelessly in Tokyo and Elsewhere", John Nathan, New York: Free Press.  2008.  pp. 125–126.

Book Review on Des Pres' Praises and Dispraises
Frederick Busch's obituary
"REMEMBERING TERRENCE DES PRES", The Colgate Scene, January 1997
Colgate University Crawshaw Chair
Jean-Paul Des Pres article mentioning his father
"Genocide and Memory" conference
"The Holocaust and the Demon in us All," David Mehegan, The Boston Globe, December 27, 1990.

1939 births
1987 deaths
20th-century American historians
American male non-fiction writers
Historians of the Holocaust
Colgate University faculty
People from Effingham, Illinois
Southeast Missouri State University alumni
Washington University in St. Louis alumni
Suicides by hanging in New York (state)
Historians from New York (state)
Historians from Illinois
20th-century American male writers
Harvard Fellows